Marina M. Romanova is a Russian-American computational astrophysicist, known for her work simulating the magnetohydrodynamics of accretion disks, including their interactions with the stellar magnetic fields of T Tauri stars and other young magnetized stars, and the formation of magnetic towers along the rotation axis of the accretion disks of black holes. She works as a senior research associate in the Cornell Center for Astrophysics and Planetary Science, in the Department of Astronomy at Cornell University.

Education and career
Romanova studied astronomy at Moscow State University, graduating in 1978. After continuing as a graduate student at Moscow State University, she became a researcher at the Russian Space Research Institute from 1981 to 1996, earning a Ph.D. in astrophysics and radioastronomy there in 1986 under the joint supervision of Yakov Zeldovich and Gennady S. Bisnovatyi-Kogan.

She came to Cornell University as a visiting scientist in 1996, and became a permanent researcher there in 1999.

References

External links
Home page

Year of birth missing (living people)
Living people
American astrophysicists
Russian astrophysicists
Women astrophysicists
Moscow State University alumni